Dociostaurus is a genus of grasshoppers in the family Acrididae, subfamily Gomphocerinae and typical of 
the tribe Dociostaurini.  Species are found in Africa, southern Europe and Asia, and includes the economically important Moroccan locust.

Subgenera and Species
The Orthoptera Species File lists:
 unplaced: Dociostaurus biskrensis Moussi & Petit, 2014
subgenus Dociostaurus Fieber, 1853
 Dociostaurus ciostaurus Fieber, 1853
 Dociostaurus apicalis (Walker, 1871)
 Dociostaurus australis (Bolívar, 1889)
 Dociostaurus brachypterus Demirsoy, 1979
 Dociostaurus cephalotes Uvarov, 1923
 Dociostaurus curvicercus Uvarov, 1942
 Dociostaurus diamesus Bey-Bienko, 1948
 Dociostaurus hammadae Ingrisch, 1983
 Dociostaurus hispanicus Bolívar, 1898
 Dociostaurus histrio (Fischer von Waldheim, 1846)
 Dociostaurus kervillei Bolívar, 1911
 Dociostaurus maroccanus (Thunberg, 1815)type species (as Gryllus maroccanus Thunberg)
 Dociostaurus minutus La Greca, 1962
 Dociostaurus pecularis Moeed, 1971
 Dociostaurus plotnikovi Uvarov, 1921
 Dociostaurus salmani Demirsoy, 1979
 Dociostaurus turbatus (Walker, 1871)
subgenus Kazakia Bey-Bienko, 1933
 Dociostaurus brevicollis (Eversmann, 1848)
 Dociostaurus genei (Ocskay, 1832)
 Dociostaurus icconium Sirin & Mol, 2013
 Dociostaurus jagoi Soltani, 1978
 Dociostaurus tarbinskyi (Bey-Bienko, 1933)
 Dociostaurus tartarus Stshelkanovtzev, 1921
subgenus Stauronotulus Tarbinsky, 1940
 Dociostaurus brachypterus Liu, 1981 [temporary name]
 Dociostaurus cappadocicus (Azam, 1913)
 Dociostaurus crassiusculus (Pantel, 1886)
 Dociostaurus dantini Bolívar, 1914
 Dociostaurus hauensteini (Bolívar, 1893)
 Dociostaurus kraussi (Ingenitskii, 1897)
 Dociostaurus kurdus Uvarov, 1921

Gallery

References

External links

Acrididae genera
Gomphocerinae
Orthoptera of Africa
Orthoptera of Asia
Orthoptera of Europe